Emily Skopov (born 1966) is an American screenwriter and politician.

Personal life
Skopov was born in 1966 in New York, and is of Jewish descent. She was raised in Rockland County. Skopov earned an undergraduate degree in English literature from Columbia University, and planned to become an English professor or lawyer. She committed to writing only after attending the UCLA School of Theater, Film and Television. In 2010, Skopov moved to Pittsburgh, Pennsylvania, from El Segundo, California, then settled in Marshall Township with her husband Todd Normane and two children. Skopov is the founder of the non-profit organization No Crayon Left Behind. The organization was established in 2011, soon after Skopov began collecting discarded crayons from restaurants and distributing them to places where they would be used, such as homeless shelters, daycares, and preschools.

Film and television
Skopov worked on several television shows including The Client, Xena: Warrior Princess, Pacific Blue, Crisis Center, and Andromeda. She left the crew of Farscape after six months, to focus on raising her daughter. Skopov began work on the 2006 film Novel Romance, which she directed and cowrote, shortly before her son was born.

Political career

2018 election 
Skopov sought the District 28 seat in the Pennsylvania House of Representatives as a Democratic Party candidate in 2018. During her campaign, Skopov criticized incumbent legislator Mike Turzai for mounting several unsuccessful bids for higher electoral office. Turzai retained the seat, in the closest contest since he was first elected in 2001.

2020 election 
In August 2019, Skopov began her second campaign for the state legislature. Turzai announced his retirement from politics, then resigned his seat before the 2020 general election, and Skopov faced Republican candidate Rob Mercuri. Skopov positioned herself as a moderate Democrat.

Skopov was defeated in the general election. Following her defeat and the Democrats' failure to flip the state legislature, Skopov wrote on Twitter that she had been “a casualty/collateral damage of this offensively poor messaging,” referring to the Democratic Party's inability to defend moderate Democrats in swing districts against Republican attempts to inaccurately tag them with positions of supporting "socialism" and "defunding the police".

References

External links

1966 births
Living people
Pennsylvania Democrats
Politicians from Pittsburgh
Screenwriters from New York (state)
Screenwriters from Pennsylvania
Screenwriters from California
American women film directors
American women screenwriters
Columbia University alumni
UCLA Film School alumni
Film directors from California
Film directors from Pennsylvania
Film directors from New York (state)
People from El Segundo, California
Writers from Pittsburgh
21st-century American women politicians
21st-century American politicians
Women in Pennsylvania politics
21st-century American women writers
Jewish American people in Pennsylvania politics
Jewish American screenwriters
20th-century American women writers
People from Rockland County, New York
21st-century American Jews
American nonprofit chief executives
American nonprofit executives